Sabit is an Arabic masculine given name, meaning "firmly in place”, “stable”, “unshakable”, "Nunuman", from Thabit (ثابت). Notable people with the name include:

Sami Sabit Karaman (1877–1957), officer of the Ottoman Army and a general of the Turkish Army
Sabit Damolla (1883–1934), Uyghur independence movement leader
Sabit Lulo (1883-?), Albanian politician, active in the Ottoman Empire and Albania
Sabit Noyan (1887–1967), officer of the Ottoman Army and the general of the Turkish Army
Sabit Mukanov (1900–1973) poet, social activist, academic, head of the Writers' Union of Kazakhstan
Sabit Orujov (1912–1981), Deputy Prime-minister of Azerbaijan SSR (1957–1959)
Sabit Uka (1920–2006), Kosovar Albanian historian 
Sabit Osman Avcı (1921–2009), Turkish politician
Ferdi Sabit Soyer (born 1952), former Prime Minister of the Turkish Republic of Northern Cyprus
Sabit İnce (born 1954), Turkish poet and Islamist scholar
Sabit Hadžić (born 1957), former basketball player, competed for Yugoslavia in the Olympics
Baptist Sabit Frances, South Sudanese politician

See also
Sabi (disambiguation)
Sabieite
Salbit
Tsabit

tr:Sabit